Aliishimia is a  Gram-negative, aerobic and non-motile bacterial genus from the family Rhodobacteraceae with one known species (Aliishimia ponticola). Aliishimia ponticola has been isolated from seawater from the Jeju island.

References

Rhodobacteraceae
Bacteria genera
Taxa described in 2019
Monotypic bacteria genera